No Man's Law is a 1927 American silent Western film starring Rex the King of Wild Horses and featuring Oliver Hardy as a lustful villain.

Plot

Cast
Rex the King of Wild Horses as Nobody's Horse
Barbara Kent as Toby Belcher
James Finlayson as Jack Belcher
Oliver Hardy as Sharkey Nye
Theodore Von Eltz as Spider O'Day

Notes
 No Man's Law has scenes, including in flashback, of Barbara Kent appearing to dive and swim in the nude, but she is actually wearing a flesh-colored moleskin bathing suit. That footage created a minor scandal at the time, drawing special attention from review boards in various communities throughout the country. In June 1927 in New York City, the entertainment trade publication Variety gave the production an overall favorable rating but predicted trouble for that portion of the film: "Miss Kent looks and acts well. A couple of the almost nude scenes will not stand much chance with the censors out of town."
 The original working title of the film was The Avenging Stallion.
 Filming took place on Hal Roach's Big Horn Ranch in Nevada.
 Prints of the film exist.

References

External links

1927 films
1927 Western (genre) films
American black-and-white films
Silent American Western (genre) films
Pathé Exchange films
Films directed by Fred Jackman
1920s American films